Joshua Lee Fisher (born October 24, 1980) is an American retired basketball player and a current coach. He is a 1.89 m (6 ft 2 in) 85 kg (187 lb.) guard. He also has Spanish citizenship.

College career
Fisher played college basketball at Saint Louis University with the Saint Louis Billikens.

Pro career
Fisher began his professional career in 2004 with the Spanish third division club Pamesa Castellón. He then joined the ACB club Pamesa Valencia later in 2004 for one month, before returning to Castellón. He then spent the next two seasons with second division clubs CAI Zaragoza and Farho Gijón before moving to ACB powerhouse Real Madrid for the second half of 2006.

He then spent half a season with Polaris World Murcia before moving to Etosa Alicante where they were relegated from the ACB at the end of 2007.  Fisher remained for one more year with Alicante and then returned to the ACB where he spent two seasons with CB Gran Canaria until 2010, when he signed for Bizkaia Bilbao Basket.  His spell in Bilbao lasted 3 games and then moved back to Real Madrid on a 3-month contract to replace the injured Pablo Prigioni, but returned to Bilbao until the end of the 2010–11 season, after his contract with Real Madrid expired.

On September 28, 2012, Fisher signed with Asefa Estudiantes.

In January 2014, he signed with Panelefsiniakos of the Greek Basket League for the rest of the 2013–14 season.

Coach career
Fisher started his coach career in 2015 as assistant coach of Fotios Katsikaris at Spanish UCAM Murcia.

References

1980 births
Living people
AB Castelló players
American expatriate basketball people in Greece
American expatriate basketball people in Spain
American men's basketball players
Basketball players from Washington, D.C.
Basketball players from Washington (state)
Basket Zaragoza players
Bilbao Basket players
CB Estudiantes players
CB Gran Canaria players
CB Lucentum Alicante players
CB Murcia players
Gijón Baloncesto players
Guards (basketball)
Liga ACB players
Mercer Island High School alumni
Panelefsiniakos B.C. players
People from Mercer Island, Washington
Real Madrid Baloncesto players
Saint Louis Billikens men's basketball players
Sportspeople from King County, Washington
Valencia Basket players